MT-Propeller Entwicklung GmbH, founded in 1980 by Gerd Muehlbauer, is a manufacturer of composite propellers for single and twin engine aircraft, airships, wind tunnels and other special applications.

The company headquarters is located at Straubing Wallmuhle Airport in Bavaria, Germany.

History
In 2010 the company developed a special propeller design for restorations of the North American F-82 Twin Mustang.

Applications

Factory installed

Installed under an STC

Installed on unmanned combat aerial vehicle (UCAV)

See also
List of aircraft propeller manufacturers

References

External links 

Aircraft component manufacturers of Germany
Aerospace companies of Germany
Aircraft propeller manufacturers
Companies established in 1981